Doina clarkei is a moth in the family Depressariidae. It was described by Luis E. Parra and Héctor Ibarra-Vidal in 1991. It is found in Chile.

Adults are on wing from November to January.

The larvae feed on Nothofagus obliqua.

References

Moths described in 1991
Doina (moth)
Endemic fauna of Chile